Far North is a 1988 American comedy-drama film written and directed by Sam Shepard. The film stars Jessica Lange, Charles Durning, Tess Harper, Donald Moffat, Ann Wedgeworth and Patricia Arquette.

Far North was released in the United States on September 10, 1988, by Nelson Entertainment.

Premise
After her father is injured in a horse-riding accident, a young woman faces the trials and tribulations of her dysfunctional, countryside family when he pressures her into euthanizing the horse.

Cast
 Jessica Lange as Kate
 Charles Durning as Bertrum
 Tess Harper as Rita
 Donald Moffat as Uncle Dane
 Ann Wedgeworth as Amy
 Patricia Arquette as Jilly
 Nina Draxten as Gramma

References

External links
 
 
 

1988 films
1988 comedy-drama films
Films with screenplays by Sam Shepard
Films shot in Minnesota
American black comedy films
American comedy-drama films
1988 directorial debut films
1980s English-language films
1980s American films